Pisidium moitessierianum is a species of minute freshwater clam. It is an aquatic bivalve mollusc in the family Sphaeriidae.

Description 
This species is the smallest of the pea clams or Pisidium species, and the smallest of any freshwater bivalve, at 1.5 - 2.5 mm. adult size. The shell is long-oval and oblique wedge-shaped with prominent umbos which are slightly behind the midpoint. The umbos are demarcated by a shallow furrow. The surface (periostracum) is silky, with regular concentric striae.

Distribution
The species is native to Europe but has been introduced to northeastern North America.
 Czech Republic – in Bohemia, in Moravia, - endangered (EN)
 Slovakia
 Germany – endangered (gefährdet)
 Nordic countries: Denmark, Finland, Norway and Sweden (not in Faroes, Iceland)
Great Britain and Ireland

References
Notes

Sources
 Zettler, M.L., Kuiper, J.G.J. 2002: Zur Verbreitung und Ökologie von Pisidium moitessierianum (Paladilhe 1866) unter besonderer Berücksichtigung von Nordostdeutschland (Mollusca: Bivalvia: Sphaeriidae). Mitteilungen der Deutschen Malakozoologischen Gesellschaft 67: 9-26

External links
Pisidium moitessierianum at Animalbase taxonomy,short description, biology,status (threats), images
Pisidium moitessierianum illustrated in Danmarks Fauna (Georg Mandahl-Barth)

moitessierianum
Molluscs described in 1866